Joanne Pransky is an American robotics enthusiast and futurist who provides professional advice on using and marketing robotics devices. Her professional focus is on issues concerning human–robot interaction.

Education
Pransky graduated from Tufts University in 1981 with a degree in psychology.

Career
In 1996 she became the U.S. Associate Editor for 'Industrial Robot Journal' published by Emerald Group Publishing. She formerly served as the U.S. Associate Editor for Emerald's journals Assembly Automation and  Sensor Review. Since its founding in April 2004 she is associate editor of Medical Robotics and Computer Assisted Surgery.

She worked as a judge on the television series BattleBots when it was aired by Comedy Central and was a judge for the First Robot/Human Arm Wrestling Competition.

References

External links

Futurologists
American television personalities
American women television personalities
Tufts University School of Arts and Sciences alumni
 1960 births
Living people
 Academic journal editors